{{Infobox urban feature
|name=Fontana delle Api
|location=Piazza Barberini, Rome, Italy
|place_type=Fountain
|image_place=Giovanni Lorenzo Bernini-Fontana delle Api-Piazza Barberini.jpg
|image_caption=Fontana delle Api by Gian Lorenzo Bernini.
|imagesize=270
|designer=Gian Lorenzo Bernini
|coordinates=
|image_map=
 
}}
Fontana delle Api (Fountain of the Bees) is a fountain located in the Piazza Barberini in Rome where the Via Veneto enters the piazza. It was sculpted by Gian Lorenzo Bernini and completed in April 1644. 

DescriptionFontana delle Api consists of a marble bi-valve shell with three bees of the same material resting on it. The fountain was intended to be a watering trough for horses. An inscription on the shell reads, "Urban VIII Pont. Max., having built a fountain for the public ornamentation of the City, also built this little fountain to be of service to private citizens. In the year 1644, XXI of his pontificate."  The "public ornamentation" referred to in the inscription is the Fontana del Tritone (Triton Fountain''), which Bernini had completed the year before.

See also 
List of fountains in Rome
List of works by Gian Lorenzo Bernini

References
Piazza Barberini

External links
 

1644 works
Insects in art
1640s sculptures
Api
Marble sculptures in Italy
Sculptures by Gian Lorenzo Bernini
Seashells in art
Rome R. XVI Ludovisi